is a mountain in Lorn, south of Glen Coe in the Scottish Highlands. It is part of the Bidean nam Bian massif and is often considered a subsidiary peak of Bidean, though since the 1997 revision of Munros Tables it has been classified as a separate Munro. To the northeast is the ridge of Beinn Fhada ('the long mountain').

The mountain is usually climbed together with Bidean nam Bian, thus allowing for a traverse of the range. One of the most common routes from Glen Coe is to ascend the head of Coire Gabhail (the 'Hidden Glen' or 'Lost Valley') to reach the bealach between Stob Coire Sgreamhach and Bidean nam Bian. The wide floor of this corrie is hidden from view when seen from Glen Coe, and was used by the local Clan MacDonald to hide livestock, whether their own or stolen on raids.

Another route of ascent is via Beinn Fhada, the most easterly of the famous Three Sisters of Glen Coe. This route also starts from Coire Gabhail, but then climbs steeply up the ridge that marks the southeastern edge of the glen. Stob Coire Sgreamhach may also be climbed from Glen Etive to the southeast by way of a steep rocky ridge.

References

Munros
Mountains and hills of the Central Highlands
Mountains and hills of Highland (council area)
One-thousanders of Scotland
Glen Coe